Kyle Bennett may refer to:

 Kyle Bennett (BMX rider)  (1979–2012), American professional BMX racer
 Kyle Bennett (footballer) (born 1990), English footballer
 Kyle Bennett, a fictional character on the Australian soap opera Home and Away, later known as Kyle Braxton